The Harvard Mark III, also known as ADEC (for Aiken Dahlgren Electronic Calculator) was an early computer that was partially electronic and partially electromechanical.  It was built at Harvard University under the supervision of Howard Aiken for the U.S. Navy.

Technical overview
The Mark III processed numbers of 16 decimal digits (plus sign), each digit encoded with four bits, though using a form of encoding that is different to conventional binary-coded decimal today. Numbers were read and processed serially, meaning one decimal digit at a time, but the four bits for the digit were read in parallel. The instruction length, however, was 38 bits, read in parallel.

It used 5,000 vacuum tubes and 1,500 crystal diodes. It used magnetic drum memory of 4,350 words. Its addition time was 4,400 microseconds and the multiplication time was 13,200 microseconds (times include memory access time). Aiken boasted that the Mark III was the fastest electronic computer in the world.

The Mark III used nine magnetic drums (one of the first computers to do so). One drum could contain 4,000 instructions and has an access time of 4,400 microseconds; thus it was a stored-program computer. The arithmetic unit could access two other drums – one contained 150 words of constants and the other contained 200 words of variables. Both of these drums also had an access time of 4,400 microseconds. This separation of data and instructions is known as the Harvard architecture. There were six other drums that held a total of 4,000 words of data, but the arithmetic unit couldn't access these drums directly. Data had to be transferred between these drums and the drum the arithmetic unit could access via registers implemented by electromechanical relays. This was a bottleneck in the computer and made the access time to data on these drums long – 80,000 microseconds. This was partially compensated for by the fact that twenty words could be transferred on each access.

The Mark III was finished in September 1949 and delivered to the U.S. Naval Proving Ground at the U.S. Navy base at Dahlgren, Virginia in March 1950. Rebuilding the computer in its new location took the remainder of the year. It became operational in 1951, and was being operated 24 hours a day, 6 days a week by October.

See also
 Harvard Mark I
 Harvard Mark II
 Harvard Mark IV
 Howard Aiken
 List of vacuum tube computers

References

Further reading
A History of Computing Technology, Michael R. Williams, 1997, IEEE Computer Society Press,

External links
BRL report, 1955 - see ADEC

1950s computers
Computer-related introductions in 1951
Electro-mechanical computers
One-of-a-kind computers
Vacuum tube computers
Harvard University
History of the United States Navy